Cluster of Differentiation 276 (CD276) or B7 Homolog 3 (B7-H3) is a human protein encoded by the  gene.

Structure 

B7-H3 is a 316 amino acid-long type I transmembrane protein, existing in two isoforms determined by its extracellular domain. In mice, the extracellular domain consists of a single pair of immunoglobulin variable (IgV)-like and immunoglobulin constant (IgC)-like domains, whereas in humans it consists of one pair (2Ig-B7-H3) or two identical pairs (4Ig-B7-H3) due to exon duplication. B7-H3 mRNA is expressed in most normal tissues. In contrast, B7-H3 protein has a very limited expression on normal tissues because of its post-transcriptional regulation by microRNAs. However, B7-H3 protein is expressed at high frequency on many different cancer types (60% of all cancers).

Function 

In non-malignant tissues, B7-H3 has a predominantly inhibitory role in adaptive immunity, suppressing T cell activation and proliferation. 

In malignant tissues, B7-H3 is an immune checkpoint molecule that inhibits tumor antigen-specific immune responses. B7-H3 also possesses non-immunological pro-tumorigenic functions such as promoting migration, invasion, angiogenesis, chemoresistance, epithelial-to-mesenchymal transition, and affecting tumor cell metabolism.

As a possible drug target

Due to its selective expression on solid tumors, B7-H3 has been the target of several anticancer agents such as enoblituzumab (MGA271), omburtamab, MGD009, MGC018, DS-7300a, and CAR T cells.

See also 
 Cluster of differentiation

References

Further reading

External links 
 
 
 

Clusters of differentiation
Single-pass transmembrane proteins